Baron Selsdon, of Croydon in the County of Surrey, is a title in the Peerage of the United Kingdom. It was created on 14 January 1932 for the Conservative politician Sir William Mitchell-Thomson, 2nd Baronet. His son, the second Baron, was a successful racing driver, winning the 1949 24 Hours of Le Mans in the first Ferrari (although his codriver, Luigi Chinetti, actually drove for all but one half-hour). As of 2009 the titles are held by the second Baron's only son, the third Baron, who succeeded in 1963. He is one of the ninety elected hereditary peers that remain in the House of Lords after the House of Lords Act of 1999. Lord Selsdon sits on the Conservative benches. The Mitchell-Thomson Baronetcy, of Polmood in the County of Peebles, was created in the Baronetage of the United Kingdom on 26 September 1900 for the first Baron's father, Sir Mitchell Mitchell-Thomson, Lord Provost of Edinburgh from 1897 to 1900.

Mitchell-Thomson Baronets, of Polmood (1900)
Sir Mitchell Mitchell-Thomson, 1st Baronet (1846–1918)
Sir William Lowson Mitchell-Thomson, 2nd Baronet (1877–1938) (created Baron Selsdon in 1932)

Barons Selsdon (1932)
William Lowson Mitchell-Thomson, 1st Baron Selsdon (1877–1938)
Peter Mitchell-Thomson, 2nd Baron Selsdon (1913–1963)
Malcolm McEacharn Mitchell-Thomson, 3rd Baron Selsdon (b. 1937)
The heir apparent is the present holder's son Hon. Callum Malcolm McEacharn Mitchell-Thomson (b. 1969)

Arms

Notes

References
Kidd, Charles, Williamson, David (editors). Debrett's Peerage and Baronetage (1990 edition). New York: St Martin's Press, 1990, 

Baronies in the Peerage of the United Kingdom
Noble titles created in 1932
Noble titles created for UK MPs